Diphosphorus tetrachloride is an inorganic compound with a chemical formula P2Cl4.  It is a colorless liquid that decomposes near room temperature and ignites in air.

Production
It was first prepared in 1910 by Gauthier by the following reaction:
2 PCl3 +  H2  →  P2Cl4 + 2 HCl

An improved method involves coevaporation of phosphorus trichloride and copper, as described by the following:
2 PCl3 +  2 Cu  →  P2Cl4 + 2 CuCl

Reactions
Near room temperature, the compound degrades to give phosphorus trichloride and an ill-defined phosphorus monochloride:
 P2Cl4 → PCl3  +  1/n [PCl]n

The compound adds to cyclohexene to give trans-C6H10-1,2-(PCl2)2.

References

Phosphorus chlorides
Phosphorus(II) compounds
Substances discovered in the 1910s